Workin' Together is a studio album released by Ike & Tina Turner on Liberty Records in November 1970. This was their second album with Liberty and their most successful studio album. The album contains their Grammy Award-winning single "Proud Mary."

Content and release 
Much like their previous album, Come Together, the album featured several covers of rock songs and also featured renewed versions of previous Ike & Tina songs, which was a habit for the couple. The album featured the duo's biggest-selling hit, a funk rock styled cover of "Proud Mary." The B-side, "Funkier Than a Mosquita's Tweeter" was written by Tina's sister Alline Bullock and later covered by Nina Simone. Several of the songs were written by Ike (including two by "Eki Renrut" which is Ike Turner backwards) including "The Way You Love Me" which the Turners had recorded for their debut album, The Soul of Ike & Tina Turner, nearly a decade earlier.

Three singles were released from the album in the US. The title track, "Workin' Together," peaked at No. 41 on the Billboard R&B chart and No. 105 on Bubbling Under The Hot 100. The second single, a cover of "Proud Mary" by Creedence Clearwater Revival, became the duo's biggest hit. It peaked at No. 4 on the Hot 100 chart and reached No. 5 on the R&B chart. It also earned Ike and Tina a Grammy Award for Best R&B Vocal Performance by a Group in 1972. The third single, a cover of  "Ooh Poo Pah Doo" by Jessie Hill, peaked at No. 31 on the R&B chart and No. 60 on the Hot 100. A fourth single, a cover of "Get Back" by the Beatles, was released in Germany.

Critical reception 

Village Voice critic Robert Christgau wrote of the album: "There's a pretty fair remake of 'Ooh Poo Pah Doo' in between the two great cuts on this album—the easy-to-rough 'Proud Mary' (with Ike rolling in back) and their first successful 'peace and love' 'generation' song, appropriately entitled 'Funkier Than a Mosquita's Tweeter.' Someone named Eki Renrut contributes a pretty fair do-right-man song. And Tina tries valiantly to sing her way out of some gunny sacks." 

Billboard (November 21, 1970):  Nobody works harder than Ike & Tina Turner and workin' together they take top material, rip it up, and resoul "Proud Mary," "Let It Be," "Get Back" and "Ooh Poo Pah Doo" their way. The duo gather a full head of funky, raucous steam, hitting only the heights of energy and excitement on the title romp, plus more of Ike's super rhythm workouts. Can't keep this kind of "up" music down. Record World (November 21, 1970): "Ike and Tina Turner have profited in every way possible from workin' together, and from the evidence given here they are still getting better and better. The Beatles and others have their songs enlivened by Tina's unique chanting on 'Get Back,' "Proud Mary,' 'Let It Be.'"

Awards 
In 1971, Ike & Tina Turner won the Prix Otis Redding (best R&B album) from the Académie du Jazz for Workin' Together.

Reissues 
Workin' Together was digitally remastered and released by BGO records on the compilation CD Workin' Together/Let Me Touch Your Mind in 2011. The album was reissued on vinyl in 2016.

Track listing 
All tracks written by Ike Turner, except where noted. Tracks 1 and 6 were credited to "Eki Renrut" (Ike Turner backwards).

Personnel 
Tina Turner – lead vocals
Ike Turner – vocals (intro of "Proud Mary"), all instrumentation
The Ikettes – background vocals
The Kings of Rhythm – all instrumentation
Brent Maher – engineer
Herb Kravitz – photography
Ron Wolin – art direction

Charts

Weekly charts

Year-end charts

References

1970 albums
Ike & Tina Turner albums
Albums produced by Ike Turner
Liberty Records albums
Albums recorded at Bolic Sound